The Canadian province of Saskatchewan held municipal elections on October 26, 2016.

Listed below are selected municipal mayoral and city councillor races across the province.

Corman Park No. 344

Estevan

Humboldt

Lloydminster

Martensville

Council 
Winners in bold.

Meadow Lake

Melfort

Moose Jaw

North Battleford

Pilot Butte

Mayor

Council

Prince Albert

Mayor

Prince Albert City Council

Regina

Mayor

Regina City Council

*  Hincks had died on October 14, after nominations had closed, and therefore remained on the ballot.

Saskatoon

Mayor

Saskatoon City Council

Swift Current

Warman

Weyburn

Yorkton

References

Municipal elections in Saskatchewan
Saskatchewan municipal
2016 in Saskatchewan
October 2016 events in Canada